A laser designator is a laser light source which is used to designate a target. Laser designators provide targeting for laser-guided bombs, missiles, or precision artillery munitions, such as the Paveway series of bombs, AGM-114 Hellfire, or the M712 Copperhead round, respectively.

When a target is marked by a designator, the beam is invisible and does not shine continuously. Instead, a series of coded laser pulses, also called PRF codes (pulse repetition frequency), are fired at the target. These signals bounce off the target into the sky, where they are detected by the seeker on the laser-guided munition, which steers itself towards the centre of the reflected signal. Unless the people being targeted possess laser detection equipment or can hear aircraft overhead, it is extremely difficult for them to determine whether they are being marked. Laser designators work best in clear atmospheric conditions. Cloud cover, rain or smoke can make reliable designation of targets difficult or impossible unless a simulation is accessible through available ground data.

Deployment
Laser designators may be mounted on aircraft, ground vehicles, naval vessels, or handheld. Depending on the wavelength of light used by the designator, the designation laser may or may not be visible to the personnel deploying it. This is the case with 1064 nm laser designators used by JTACs as that wavelength of light is difficult to see under standard Gen III/III+ night vision devices. Other imaging devices with "see-spot" capabilities to "see" the laser spot are often utilized to make sure the target is being correctly designated. These may include FLIR (forward looking infrared) thermal imagers which normally operate in the MWIR or LWIR spectrum but have a 1064 nm window in which they can see-spot the laser.

Airborne
The U.S. Air Force selected the Lockheed Martin's Sniper Advanced Targeting Pod (ATP) in 2004.  It equipped multiple USAF platforms such as the F-16, F-15E, B-1, B-52, and A-10C.  It also operates on multiple international fighter platforms.  The U.S. Navy currently employ LITENING and ATFLIR targeting pods on a variety of strike aircraft. The Litening II is widely used by many other of the world's air forces. The United Kingdom's Royal Air Force use the Litening III system and the French use the TALIOS (Targeting Long-range Identification Optronic System), Damocles and ATLIS II.

Ground-based

U.S. Air Force Joint Terminal Air Controllers and Marine Corps Forward Air Controllers typically employ a lightweight device, such as the AN/PED-1 Lightweight Laser Designator Rangefinder (LLDR), permitting them to designate targets for Close Air Support aircraft flying overhead and in close proximity to friendly forces. While many designators are binocular-based and may utilize tripods, smaller handheld laser designators, like the B.E. Meyers & Co. IZLID 1000P exist as well. Northrop Grumman's LLDR, using an eye-safe laser wavelength, recognizes targets, finds the range to a target, and fixes target locations for laser-guided, GPS-guided, and conventional munitions. This lightweight, interoperable system uniquely provides range finding and targeting information to other digital battlefield systems allowing the system to provide targeting information for non-guided munitions, or when laser designation is unreliable due to battlefield conditions.

See also 
 Guidance system
 Laser sight
 List of laser articles
 List of military electronics of the United States
 Targeting pods
 AN/PEQ-1 SOFLAM

References

Further reading 

 Lightweight Laser Designator Rangefinder , Northrop Grumman

Laser ranging
Missile guidance
Targeting (warfare)
Laser aiming modules